Artemis was one of the first Armenian women's literary magazines. It was published and edited in Alexandria, Egypt by Marie Beylerian from January 1902 to December 1903. For Beylerian, the publication was the realization of a lifelong dream of creating a magazine where Armenian women could freely express themselves. At a time when women were beginning to enter the public sphere, Artemis provided a platform where women could publish their own opinions about the contemporary lives of Armenian women. Contributions were sent to Artemis from all corners of the diaspora, including Kars, Nor Jugha (in Isfahan), Tbilisi, Moscow, Paris, and New York City. The magazine was praised throughout the Armenian diaspora and attracted many contributors from the diaspora's ranks.

References

External links

1902 establishments in the Ottoman Empire
1903 disestablishments in the Ottoman Empire
Armenian-language magazines
Defunct literary magazines published in Egypt
Feminism in Egypt
Feminist magazines
Magazines established in 1902
Magazines disestablished in 1903
Mass media in Alexandria
Women's magazines published in Egypt